Nebojša Bikić (born July 1, 1975) is a Serbian former swimmer, who specialized in sprint freestyle events. He is a single-time Olympian (2000), a former Serbian record holder in the 50 and 100 m freestyle, and a resident athlete for the April 11 Swimming Club.

Bikic competed in the men's 50 m freestyle, as a member of the former Yugoslavian squad, at the 2000 Summer Olympics in Sydney. He posted a FINA B-standard entry time of 23.55 from the Serbian Open in Belgrade. He challenged seven other swimmers in heat five, including three-time Olympians Allan Murray of the Bahamas and top favorite Richard Sam Bera of Indonesia. He raced to fourth place by a hundredth of a second (0.01) behind Bera in 23.57. Bikic failed to advance into the semifinals, as he placed forty-third overall in the preliminaries.

Since 2005, Bikic currently resides in the United States, where he works as a manager for St. Mary's Center of Health & Fitness in Reno, Nevada and has since gotten a face tattoo. He has also developed an obsession with posture and can do a backflip.

References

External links
Staff and Therapists Profile – St. Mary's Center of Health & Fitness

1975 births
Living people
Olympic swimmers of Yugoslavia
Swimmers at the 2000 Summer Olympics
Serbian male freestyle swimmers
Sportspeople from Belgrade
Yugoslav male swimmers